Henry Fuseli  (German: Johann Heinrich Füssli ; 7 February 1741 – 17 April 1825) was a Swiss painter, draughtsman and writer on art who spent much of his life in Britain. Many of his works, such as The Nightmare, deal with supernatural subject matter. He painted works for John Boydell's Shakespeare Gallery, and created his own "Milton Gallery". He held the posts of Professor of Painting and Keeper at the Royal Academy. His style had a considerable influence on many younger British artists, including William Blake.

Biography

Fuseli was born in Zürich, Switzerland, the second of 18 children. His father was Johann Caspar Füssli, a painter of portraits and landscapes, and author of Lives of the Helvetic Painters. He intended Henry for the church, and sent him to the Caroline college of Zurich, where he received an excellent classical education. One of his schoolmates there was Johann Kaspar Lavater, with whom he became close friends.

After taking orders in 1761, Fuseli was forced to leave the country as a result of having helped Lavater to expose an unjust magistrate, whose powerful family sought revenge. He travelled through Germany, and then, in 1765, visited England, where he supported himself for some time by miscellaneous writing. Eventually, he became acquainted with Sir Joshua Reynolds, to whom he showed his drawings. Following Reynolds' advice, he decided to devote himself entirely to art. In 1770 he made an art-pilgrimage to Italy, where he remained until 1778, changing his name from Füssli to the more Italian-sounding Fuseli.

Early in 1779 he returned to Britain, visiting Zürich on the way. In London, he found a commission awaiting him from Alderman Boydell, who was then setting up his Shakespeare Gallery. Fuseli painted a number of pieces for Boydell, and published an English edition of Lavater's work on physiognomy. He also gave William Cowper some valuable assistance in preparing a translation of Homer. In 1788 Fuseli married Sophia Rawlins (originally one of his models), and he soon after became an associate of the Royal Academy. The early feminist Mary Wollstonecraft, whose portrait he had painted, planned a trip with him to Paris, and pursued him determinedly, but communication between the two was stopped by Rawlins. Fuseli later said "I hate clever women. They are only troublesome". In 1790 he became a full academician, presenting Thor Battering the Midgard Serpent as his diploma work. In 1799 Fuseli was appointed professor of painting to the Academy. Four years later he was chosen as Keeper, and resigned his professorship, but resumed it in 1810, continuing to hold both offices until his death. He was succeeded as keeper by Henry Thomson.

In 1799 Fuseli exhibited a series of paintings from subjects furnished by the works of John Milton, with a view to forming a Milton gallery comparable to Boydell's Shakespeare gallery. There were 47 Milton paintings, many of them very large, completed at intervals over nine years. The exhibition proved a commercial failure and closed in 1800. In 1805 he brought out an edition of Pilkington's Lives of the Painters, which did little for his reputation.

Antonio Canova, when on his visit to England, was much taken with Fuseli's works, and on returning to Rome in 1817 caused him to be elected a member of the first class in the Academy of St Luke.

Works
As a painter, Fuseli favoured the supernatural. He pitched everything on an ideal scale, believing a certain amount of exaggeration necessary in the higher branches of historical painting. In this theory he was confirmed by the study of Michelangelo's works and the marble statues of the Monte Cavallo, which, when at Rome, he liked to contemplate in the evening, relieved against a murky sky or illuminated by lightning.

Describing his style, the 1911 edition of the Encyclopædia Britannica said that:His figures are full of life and earnestness, and seem to have an object in view which they follow with intensity. Like Rubens he excelled in the art of setting his figures in motion. Though the lofty and terrible was his proper sphere, Fuseli had a fine perception of the ludicrous. The grotesque humour of his fairy scenes, especially those taken from A Midsummer-Night's Dream, is in its way not less remarkable than the poetic power of his more ambitious works.

Though not noted as a colourist, Fuseli was described as a master of light and shadow. Rather than setting out his palette methodically in the manner of most painters, he merely distributed the colours across it randomly. He often used his pigments in the form of a dry powder, which he hastily combined on the end of his brush with oil, or turpentine, or gold size, regardless of the quantity, and depending on accident for the general effect. This recklessness may perhaps be explained by the fact that he did not paint in oil until the age of 25.

Fuseli painted more than 200 pictures, but he exhibited only a small number of them. His earliest painting represented Joseph interpreting the Dreams of the Baker and Butler, but the first to excite particular attention was The Nightmare, exhibited in 1782, a painting of which he painted several versions. Themes seen in The Nightmare such as horror, dark magic and sexuality, were echoed in his 1796 painting, Night-Hag visiting the Lapland Witches.

His sketches or designs numbered about 800; they have admirable qualities of invention and design, and are frequently superior to his paintings. In his drawings, as in his paintings, his methods included deliberately exaggerating the proportions of the human body and throwing his figures into contorted attitudes. One technique involved setting down arbitrary points on a sheet, which then became the extreme points of the various limbs. Notable examples of these drawings were made in concert with George Richmond when the two artists were together in Rome. He rarely drew figures from life, basing his art on study of the antique and Michelangelo.

He produced no landscapes—"Damn Nature! she always puts me out" was his characteristic exclamation—and painted only two portraits. However, similar to contemporary landscape painters such as J. M. W. Turner, he evoked qualities of terror and the sublime.

Many interesting anecdotes of Fuseli, and his relations to contemporary artists, are given in his Life by John Knowles (1831). He influenced the art of Fortunato Duranti.

Writings

In 1788 Fuseli started to write essays and reviews for the Analytical Review. With Thomas Paine, William Godwin, Joseph Priestley, Erasmus Darwin, Mary Wollstonecraft, and others interested in art, literature and politics, Fuseli frequented the home of Joseph Johnson, a publisher and prominent figure in radical British political and intellectual life. He also visited Allerton Hall in Liverpool, the home of William Roscoe.

When Louis XVI was executed in France in 1793, Fuseli condemned the revolution as despotic and anarchic, although he had first welcomed it as a sign of "an age pregnant with the most gigantic efforts of character".

He was a thorough master of French, Italian, English and German, and could write in all these languages with equal facility and vigour, although he preferred German as the vehicle of his thoughts. His principal work was his series of twelve lectures delivered to the Royal Academy, begun in 1801.

Influence
His pupils included John Constable, Benjamin Haydon, William Etty, and Edwin Landseer. William Blake, who was 16 years his junior, recognized a debt to him, and for a time many English artists copied his mannerisms.

Death
After a life of uninterrupted good health he died at the house of the Countess of Guildford on Putney Hill, at the age of 84, and was buried in the crypt of St Paul's Cathedral. He was comparatively wealthy at the time of his death.

Gallery

Films
Passion and Obsession: Henry Fuseli, 1741–1825: painter and writer by Gaudenz Meili and Prof. David H. Weinglass, Zurich 1997

See also
Füssli, Johann Caspar (1706–1782), Swiss portrait painter (father of Henry Fuseli)
Füssli, Johann Kaspar (1743–1786), Swiss entomologist (brother of Henry Fuseli)

References and sources
References

Sources

Further reading
 Calè, Luisa. Fuseli's Milton Gallery: 'Turning readers into spectators'''. Oxford: Clarendon Press, 2006.
 Hammelmann, Hans (1957). "Eighteenth-Century English Illustrators: Henry Fuseli, R.A.," The Book Collector 6 No.4 (winter): 350–363.
 Keay, Carolyn. Henry Fuseli. London: Academy Editions, 1974.
 Lentzsch, Franziska, et al. Fuseli: The Wild Swiss. Zürich: Scheidegger & Spiess, 2005.
 Myrone, Martin. Gothic Nightmares: Fuseli, Blake and the Romantic Imagination. London: Tate Publishing, 2006.
 Andrei Pop. Antiquity, Theatre, and the Painting of Henry Fuseli. Oxford: Oxford University Press, 2015.
 Powell, Nicolas. Fuseli: The Nightmare. London: Allen Lane, 1973.
 Pressly, Nancy L. The Fuseli Circle in Rome: Early Romantic Art of the 1770s. New Haven: Yale Center for British Art, 1979.
 Tomory, P. A. The Life and Art of Henry Fuseli. New York: Praeger, 1972.
 Weinglass, David H. Henry Fuseli and the Engraver's Art''. Boston: World Wide Books, 1982.

External links

 Profile on Royal Academy of Arts Collections
Fuseli's Lecture on Painting 1801

1741 births
1825 deaths
18th-century British painters
British male painters
19th-century British painters
Burials at St Paul's Cathedral
Keepers of the Royal Academy
British portrait painters
Swiss portrait painters
Royal Academicians
Artists from Zürich
18th-century Swiss painters
18th-century Swiss male artists
Swiss male painters
19th-century Swiss painters
19th-century British male artists
19th-century Swiss male artists
Henry